Conway Benning, LL.D was an Anglican priest in Ireland in the late 18th-century.

Benning was educated at Trinity College, Dublin. He was Archdeacon of Dromore from 1770 until his resignation in 1777.

Notes

Archdeacons of Dromore
Alumni of Trinity College Dublin
18th-century Irish Anglican priests
Year of birth missing
Year of death missing